Bystrica may refer to:

 Banská Bystrica, a town in central Slovakia
 Burg Považská Bystrica, a manor-house underneath the castle Považský hrad
 Kalvaria Povazska Bystrica, a series of buildings depicting the journey of Jesus Christ to his crucifixion
 Nová Bystrica, a village and municipality in Čadca District, Žilina Region, northern Slovakia
 Považská Bystrica, a town in north-western Slovakia
 Stará Bystrica, a village and municipality in Čadca District, Žilina Region, northern Slovakia
 Viaduct Považská Bystrica, a bridge across the narrowest part of Považská Bystrica in Slovakia
 Záhorská Bystrica

See also
 Bistrica (disambiguation)
 Bistritsa (disambiguation)
 Bistritz (disambiguation)
 Bistrița (disambiguation)
 Bystřice (disambiguation) (Czech variant)
 Bystrzyca (disambiguation) (Polish variant)
 Feistritz (disambiguation) (Germanised word)